Marcelle Chantal (1901–1960) was a French stage and film actress. Chantal appeared in a number of leading roles in films such as Maurice Tourneur's In the Name of the Law (1932). Early in her career she married British banker Jefferson Davis Cohn and was billed as Marcelle Jefferson-Cohn.

Selected filmography
 Le Carnaval des vérités (1920)
 The Queen's Necklace (1929)
 Tenderness (1930)
 The Indictment (1931)
 The Devil's Holiday (1931)
 In the Name of the Law (1932)
 Amok (1934)
 Antonia (1935)
 The Phantom Gondola (1936)
 Nitchevo (1936)
 A Romance in Flanders (1937)
 The Lafarge Case (1938)
 Rasputin (1938)
 Girls in Distress (1939)
 Fantomas Against Fantomas (1949)
 Julie de Carneilhan (1950)
  (1950)

References

External links

1901 births
1960 deaths
French stage actresses
French film actresses
Actresses from Paris
20th-century French actresses